Saughton is a suburb of the west of Edinburgh, Scotland, bordering Broomhouse, Stenhouse, Longstone and Carrick Knowe. In Lowland Scots, a "sauch" is a willow. The Water of Leith flows by here.

It is best known for its prison, known officially as "HM Prison Edinburgh", but colloquially as "Saughton Prison", which lies to the south of the district.

The Calder Road, one of the main city arteries, runs through it.

More recently Saughton Park has become home to an acclaimed outdoor concrete skatepark

Actually situated in the Broomhouse area and fronting on Broomhouse Drive, Saughton House is a large Government office, said to have been built in the 1950s, which houses the Scottish Government, Scottish Courts Service and a number of other Government offices.

Transport

Tram 

Saughton tram stop is adjacently south of the main Glasgow to Edinburgh railway line, close to the junction of Broomhouse Drive and Saughton Road North.

Buses

Lothian Buses 

 3, 25, 34, 35 (Calder Road) 
 1, 2, 22 (Broomhouse Drive/ Stenhouse Drive)

McGill's Scotland East 

 X22 (Calder Road)

Notable residents
 William Stevenson (1772–1829), Scottish nonconformist preacher and writer.
 Graeme Souness (1953), retired Scottish footballer and manager
 Baird baronets of Saughton Hall

Saughton cemetery

Notable interments:

Louis Deuchars sculptor

References

External links
HM Prison Edinburgh
Saughton Skatepark

Areas of Edinburgh
Edinburgh Trams stops